Experimental Audio Research (commonly shortened to E.A.R. or EAR) is an experimental music collective formed around Peter Kember (a.k.a. Sonic Boom), formerly of Spacemen 3.  While Spacemen 3 were a relatively traditional rock and roll band with strong experimental leanings, E.A.R. is essentially a free improvisation project, creating instrumental music characterized by lengthy, droning textures and slowly evolving structures.

The line-up often included Sonic Boom (Spectrum, Spacemen 3), Kevin Martin (God), Kevin Shields (My Bloody Valentine), and Eddie Prévost (AMM). Past collaborators include Lawrence Chandler of Bowery Electric, Nick Kramer, Delia Derbyshire and Thomas Köner, plus various members of Spectrum, though it is generally considered a Kember solo project. The collective is one of Kember's several post-Spacemen 3 projects, which also include Spectrum, as well albums released under the Sonic Boom moniker.

Discography

Albums
Mesmerised (Space Age Recordings, 1994)
Beyond The Pale (Big Cat, 1996, recorded 1992)
Phenomena 256 (Space Age Recordings, 1996)
The Köner Experiment (Space Age Recordings, 1997)
Millennium Music (Atavistic Records, 1998)
Pestrepeller (Ochre Records, 1999)
Data Rape (Space Age Recordings, 2000)
Live At The Dream Palace (Ochre Records, 2000)
Vibrations (Rocket Girl, 2000)
Continuum (Space Age Recordings, 2001)
Worn To A Shadow (Lumberton Trading Company, 2005)

EPs
Falling / Tail Chaser (Sympathy For The Record Industry, 1995)

References

External links
Official site
Kember's Trouser Press entry

British electronic music groups
British experimental musical groups
Rocket Girl artists
Atavistic Records artists